Zhang Xiaobai (born 19 December 1982) is a Chinese comics artist. She won the Gold Award at the 4th International Manga Award in 2011.

Biography
Zhang was born in Anshan, Liaoning, China, on December 19, 1982. She graduated from Renmin University of China.

In 2006, her manhua, Hello, won the Best short Award at the 5th China Manhua Award.

In 2011, her manhua, Si loin et si proche, was awarded the Gold Award at the 4th International Manga Award.

Work
 Hello
 Si loin et si proche
 Qinghua
 Luohuamengbi
 Space-Time Prisoner

References

External links

1982 births
People from Anshan
Living people
Renmin University of China alumni
Chinese comics artists
Chinese female comics artists
Female comics writers